Virginia or Virginia of Sagadahoc was a pinnace built in 1607 and 1608 by English colonists at the Popham Colony. The ship was a project of the Plymouth Company, branch of the proprietary Virginia Company, on land England claimed as belonging to the Virginia Colony. She was the first English ocean-going vessel built in the New World, and a demonstration of the new colony's ability to build ships. The second and third "local" pinnaces (Deliverance and Patience) were built soon afterwards in Bermuda following the loss of Sea Venture during the Third Supply.

Virginia was built at the mouth of the Kennebec River in what is now Phippsburg, Maine.

Background 

The Popham Colony, also known as the Sagadahoc Colony, was established in 1607 by the Plymouth Company. It was situated in the present town of Phippsburg, Maine at the mouth of the Sagadahoc River, now the Kennebec River. The mission was to establish an English presence in North Virginia, explore the area for gold and other valuable commodities, find the Northwest Passage, establish relations and trade with the native people (primarily for fur), and show that the area could supply all of the resources necessary to build ships.

During the 14 months the colony existed, the colonists completed a major project: the construction of a 30-ton ship, a pinnace, called Virginia. It was the first known ocean-going ship to be built in what would later become the United States of America by Europeans. It was also meant to show that the colony could be used for shipbuilding. The design of Virginia allowed several different rigs and was very versatile. Virginia could be used for coastal exploration and fishing, the North Atlantic fishing grounds, or a trans-Atlantic journey.

The term "pinnace" could mean anything from a full-rigged pinnace to a smaller boat that could be stowed (or towed) and used as a ship's tender. Virginia at 30 tons was in the middle of this range and was designed primarily for coastal exploration and defense. To sail Virginia to England the rigging was modified from coastal rigging to full ocean rigging.

Design 

Virginia would have been about 56 feet long with a beam of 15 feet 5 inches, a flush main deck that drew approximately 6 feet 5 inches fully loaded, a freeboard of less than 2 feet, and a weight of approximately 30 tons. Sketches of the replica's hull design and framing are online at the Maine First Ship website. For ocean voyages, Virginia would likely have been rigged with a square-rigged main-mast, a much smaller second mast that was gaff rigged, and a small square sail under the bowsprit. The main-mast on many pinnaces would have been large enough to carry a small topsail. Plans for Virginia that include a plausible rigging are available from the Maine's First Ship.

 
For coastal work, Virginia would have used a fore-and-aft rig with a sprit mainsail and one headsail. How the coastal rigging would have been changed for a cross-Atlantic voyage is not yet fully understood. In John Walker's drawing of Virginia when rigged for a trans Atlantic voyage, an aft-rigged mizzen mast carries a sail that resembles a lateen sail more closely than a spanker. This variety of rigs enabled the 'small' pinnaces of this era for several different assignments. They could be used as fishing boats, storage at anchor, tender to large ships or supply ships that were often towed to their destination by a larger ship.

There is a small 17th-century sketch of a pinnace on John Hunt's October 8, 1607, map of Fort St George at the Popham Colony in midcoast Maine - see image. This map was found in an archive in Spain, deposited there by a well-intentioned spy at an unknown date. This boat is thought to be the 30-ton pinnace Virginia that was built in 1607–1608 at the Popham colony on the Sagadahoc River (now Kennebec River) in southern Maine. Assuredly, lofting was done by 'eye'. Assembly was done under the direction of shipwright Digby of London.

Voyages 
  

On October 17, 1608, the Popham Colony was abandoned and the colonists boarded Virginia and the supply ship Mary and John to return to England. Structurally sound after her first ocean crossing, Virginia had more work to do. On May 23, 1609, a new Charter of the Virginia Company, drafted by Francis Bacon, was signed by King James I of England. This Charter granted a vast extension of territory and expanded powers to the Company, spurring a renewed effort to save the remaining colony at Jamestown.

Virginia was one of two pinnaces and seven larger ships in the fleet known as the Third Supply. With 500-600 people, the supply mission left Falmouth, Cornwall, England on June 8, 1609, directly for the colony in Virginia by way of the Azores and Bermuda. The flagship of this supply mission was the Sea Venture, which was the first single-timbered merchantman built in England, and also the first dedicated emigration ship. The fleet encountered a powerful three-day hurricane near Bermuda in late July 1609.. resulting in the loss of two ships, Catch and Sea Venture. Virginia left the supply fleet near the Azores presumably to return to England. She arrived undamaged at Jamestown on October 3, 1609, with 16 soldiers, six weeks after the other ships that were damaged in the Bermuda hurricane. It appears that Virginia missed the hurricane.

The battered ships of the third supply mission arrived in August with 300 colonists and scant supplies to find the Jamestown colony with fractured leadership and under siege from the Powhatan tribe.  When Virginia arrived in early October, John Smith the leader of Jamestown was seriously injured, and James Davies was sent with Virginia to command Fort Algernon at Point Comfort. By June 1610 over 80% of the colonists at Jamestown had died, and the remaining colonists (about 60) boarded Virginia and another of the supply ships and abandoned Jamestown. While still in the James River, they met the ships of Lord De la Warr the new governor of Virginia with the fourth supply mission and returned to Jamestown. 

The last historical record of Virginia was June 1610 when Captain Robert Tyndall was directed to take Virginia to catch fish in the Chesapeake Bay between Cape Henry and Cape Charles.

Reconstruction
The pinnace Virginia is being reconstructed by an all-volunteer group Maine' First Ship just upriver from the site it was originally built.  The design was completed in 2007 after extensive research, hampered by the lack of historical information.  The keel was laid on July 3, 2011. The reconstruction was done in and around the Bath Freight Shed in Bath, Maine. Virginia was launched on June 4, 2022. The goal is to create a floating classroom for students of all ages, promote an appreciation of Maine's early shipbuilding heritage, the Popham Colony, and its relationship with the Wabanaki.

References

Bibliography
Mathew Baker and the Art of the Shipwright (in German). Baker was royal ship builder under Elizabeth I. His Fragments of Ancient Shipbuilding (1586) is considered a ground breaking work and invaluable for the study of 16th century shipbuilding. Sept.15, 2005. Chapter 3 (pp. 107–165) of Stephen Johnston, ‘Making mathematical practice: gentlemen, practitioners and artisans in Elizabethan England’ (Ph.D. Cambridge, 1994).
Some Seventeenth-Century Vessels and the Sparrow-Hawk, by William Avery Baker. Pilgrim Society Note, Series One, Number 28, 1980, April 30, 2006 (Plymouth Hall Museum, Plymouth Massachusetts. Historical notes about pinnaces and shallops used during the early years of the Plymouth Colony).
Ashmore Family from Eng to Va, Md, Ga & Ar Genealogy, tales about early colonists in the mid-Atlantic Colonies and sea battles between the adventurers of Maryland and Virginia Colony. Four pinnaces are mentioned by name.
'Relation' concerning Captain James Davis (1580–1623) and the early settlement of New England & Virginia.

Further reading
History of the Popham Colony 1.
History of Popham Colony 2.
Maine's Popham Colony by William H. Tabor, Athena Review 3(2).
Pinnace Virginia at Maine Penobscot Marine Museum.
Pinnace Virginia model on display.
Learn More about Virginia (pinnace).
Catalog of Plans of historic boats and ships.
The Ship's pinnace in Cook's Bay (ie HMS Endeavour, replica)

External links
Popham Colony
Captain James Davis, 1580-1623: The Early Settlement of New England & Virginia
The Sailing Ships of New England, 1607-1907, by John Robinson and George Francis Dow, Marine Research Society, Salem, Massachusetts: 1922.
The 1606/1607 Voyage To Virginia.
Surviving Sketch of Virginia
Building a Replica of Virginia
The Pinnace Virginia Building project video
Sailing Ship Rigs
Maine's First Ship A project to reconstruct Virginia
How the Virginia was Built, A speculative reconstruction.
English Expeditions to Powhatan Country
The 1606/1607 Voyage To Virginia

1600s ships
1607 establishments in the Thirteen Colonies
Pinnaces
Sailing ships of the United States
Pre-statehood history of Maine
Virginia Company
Popham Colony